The Hypostominae are a subfamily of catfishes of the family Loricariidae. Most members are restricted to tropical and subtropical South America, but there are also several species (in genera Ancistrus, Chaetostoma, Lasiancistrus, Leptoancistrus and Hemiancistrus) in southern Central America. Hypostomus plecostomus, which is popular in the aquarium trade, has been introduced to several regions far from its native range.

Studies conducted with representatives of some genera of Hypostominae showed, within this group, the diploid number ranges from 2n = 52 to 2n = 80. However, the supposed wide karyotypic diversity the family Loricariidae or the subfamily Hypostominae
would present is almost exclusively restricted to the genus Hypostomus, and the species from the other genera had a conserved diploid number.

Taxonomy

Ancistrini (sometimes considered a separate subfamily as Ancistrinae)
 Acanthicus
 Ancistrus
 Andeancistrus
 Araichthys 
 Baryancistrus
 Chaetostoma
 Cordylancistrus
 Corymbophanes
 Dekeyseria
 Dolichancistrus
 Exastilithoxus
 Hemiancistrus
 Hopliancistrus
 Hypancistrus
 Lasiancistrus
 Leporacanthicus
 Lithoxus
 Megalancistrus
 Micracanthicus
 Neblinichthys
 Panaqolus
 Panaque
 Parancistrus
 Paulasquama
 Pseudacanthicus
 Pseudancistrus
 Pseudolithoxus
 Pseudoqolus
 Scobinancistrus
 Soromonichthys
 Spectracanthicus
 Transancistrus
 Yaluwak
 Hypostomini
 Aphanotorulus
 Hypostomus
 Isorineloricaria
 Pterygoplichthyini
 Pterygoplichthys
 Rhinelepini
 Pogonopoma
 Pseudorinelepis
 Rhinelepis
 Incertae sedis
 Ancistomus
 Cryptancistrus
 Guyanancistrus
 Leptoancistrus (likely Ancistrini)
 Peckoltia (likely Ancistrini)
 Peckoltichthys

References

 
Taxa named by Rudolf Kner
Fish subfamilies